Trail is a city in the West Kootenay region of the Interior of British Columbia, Canada. It was named after the Dewdney Trail, which passed through the area. The town was first called Trail Creek or Trail Creek Landing, and the name was shortened to Trail in 1897.

Geography
This section of the Columbia River valley is located between the Monashee Mountains to the west and the Selkirk Mountains to the east. The Columbia flows directly north-south from Castlegar, turns east near downtown Trail, and then meets the Canada–United States border at Waneta and the Pend d'Oreille River.

Summer climate in Trail is generally hot and dry with moderately cool nights. Temperatures often exceed  during summer afternoons, average . Thunderstorms are common during the late-Spring and Summer season, often moving into the valley from the south. The fall months bring dense river fog, especially overnight and in the morning, as a cold air inversion lingers above the relatively warm river surface. Winters are mild to cold with periods of moderate snowfall. Nearby villages such as Warfield, Fruitvale and especially Rossland receive greater amounts of snow due to higher elevation.

The Monashee Mountains are the first major mountain range east of the Coastal Mountains to intercept moisture laden westerly flow from the Pacific Ocean. As a result, areas west of Trail, including the Christina Range, Rossland Range, the city of Rossland, and the Blueberry-Paulson section of the Crowsnest Highway (Highway 3) receive greater amounts of winter precipitation, mostly in the form of heavy snow. Vegetation in the Trail area, although still fairly lush, is noticeably drier than other areas of the West Kootenay, with a more westerly aspect.

Demographics

Ethnicity 
The city is noted for its large Italian community. Persons of Italian ancestry numbered 1,790 and formed 23.2 percent of the total population according to the 1991 census, decreasing to 1,515 persons or 20.2 percent in 1996, falling further by 2011 to 1,290 persons or 17.4 percent of the population, prior to a slight increase to 1,320 persons or 17.8 percent according to the 2016 census.

Religion 
According to the 2021 census, religious groups in Trail included:
Irreligion (3,865 persons or 50.9%)
Christianity (3,455 persons or 45.5%)
Sikhism (95 persons or 1.3%)
Hinduism (75 persons or 1.0%)
Buddhism (15 persons or 0.2%)
Other (80 persons or 1.1%)

Education and employment

Trail is the location of the head office of the Kootenay Boundary Regional District, which is one of the city's employers.

Trail is part of School District 20 Kootenay-Columbia and schools in the town include:
Glenmerry Elementary School (Public elementary school K-7)
J. Lloyd Crowe Secondary School (Public secondary school 8–12)
James L Webster Elementary School (Public elementary school K-7.)
St. Michael's Catholic School (Independent elementary school K-7)
Kootenay-Columbia Learning Centre (Public school 6–12)

School district
The school district in the Greater Trail area is focused on improving the district and schools and has a focused, well organized improvement plans in place. The strategies selected to achieve the goals are a blend of research, best practice, and innovative thinking.

In 2007, the J. Lloyd Crowe Secondary School Replacement program started the construction of a new facility in Trail to replace the existing school that was built in the late 1950s. The new facility opened in September 2009.

Education
Trail’s education statistics differ sharply from that of the province in the percentage of the population aged 45–64 with a trades certificate or diploma: Trail—26%, compared to BC—14%. This is directly attributable to Teck Resources and the diversified mining and metals company's presence in the area. The percentage of this age group with a university level education is also very different: Trail—12%, compared to BC—22%. The general picture is a working population heavily geared to the trades and historically very reliant on Teck Resources for employment.

Economic situation
Employing approximately 1,800 people, Teck Resources (formerly Cominco) is the region’s largest employer. The average age of an employee at Teck Resources' Trail operation is 47. It is anticipated that within 15 years Teck Resources' Trail operation will have a completely new and different labour force. A younger and perhaps more technical labour force will most likely replace those that are retiring. The big picture for the area is one of an aging population which brings about ongoing employment opportunities in the area. 

The City of Trail is also home to the largest hospital in the West Kootenay region.

Teck Cominco lead-zinc smelter

Trail is home to one of the largest lead and zinc smelter in the world and the smelter is the largest employer in Trail, providing 1,400 jobs in the town of 7800. The smelter has been in operation for over a hundred years and has provided many well-paying jobs that do not require more than a high school education. Intergenerational families worked at the smelter and Teck Cominco became Trail's "economic and cultural centre."

The Teck Cominco Interpretive Centre in downtown Trail provides a history of Cominco's Trail smelting operations with displays, a mini-science centre, hands-on exhibits, and videos, as well as a 2.5 hour industrial tour of the Teck Cominco smelter. Presentations include exhibits of sophisticated environmental monitoring systems installed in the Trail area by Teck.

In February 1896, Fritz Augustus Heinze opened his British Columbia Smelting and Refining Company smelter at Trail to process ore brought from Rossland on his Columbia and Western Railway. The concentrate from the smelter was transported to Butte, Montana, for refining. The plant capacity was soon increased from about 150 to 400 tons per day. However, with the supply of Rossland ore largely going south to Northport, the plant was unprofitable. The output was 50 per cent pure copper at best, and the yellow clouds of sulfur dioxide became health hazards for the region.

When the Canadian Pacific Railway (CP) expressed interest in buying the Columbia and Western Railway (C&W), Heinze insisted the package include the Trail smelter. In February 1898, CP bought the C&W for $600,000, and the smelter for $200,000. Heinze retained several other holdings. CP created the Canadian Smelting Works to run the plant. CP's new Crowsnest Pass branch supplied cheap coal, and the new Bonnington Falls dam provided electricity. That August, new blast furnaces increased efficiency and tall chimneys lifted the toxic smoke farther above Trail.

Since lead was the most common ore in the region, the company built two lead furnaces, which were operational by the end of 1901. The next year, the federal government offered a subsidy of five dollars for each ton of lead smelted in Canada. However, the concentrate still required refining at the American Smelting and Refining Company's plant in Tacoma, Washington. To address this problem, by the end of 1902, Trail opened the first commercial electrolytic refining process in the world, producing pure lead, pure copper, fine silver and gold. In 1906, the Consolidated Mining and Smelting Company of Canada (CM&S), a consortium comprising the smelter and certain Red Mountain mines at Rossland, was formed. CP had a 54 per cent holding. After the Northport smelter closed in 1921, Trail remained the sole operator in the region.

By 1925, the 250-acre plant employed 2,100 men and comprised a lead plant, an electrolytic zinc plant, a copper smelter, a copper refinery, a silver and gold refinery, plants for making bluestone, hydrofluosilicic acid and sulfuric acid, a foundry, a machine shop and round-house, and a copper rod mill. That year, CM&S processed 380,000 tons of ores and concentrates at Trail to recover 21,352 ounces of gold, nearly 4.5 million ounces of silver, 9,500 tons of copper, 117,500 tons of lead and almost 50,000 tons of zinc.

Trail smelter arbitration (1938–1942)

By the end of World War I, the smoke pollution had devastated the surrounding district. During the following decades, this triggered the Trail Smelter dispute, which resulted in decades of legal action. This case, known commonly as the "Trail smelter arbitration", is a landmark in environmental law, as it helped to establish the "polluter pays" principle for transnational pollution issues.

In 1966, the company name changed to Cominco. Over the following decades, the smelter spent millions on pollution control. In 1975, the soils in some parts of Trail were found to be contaminated with lead and certain other heavy metals (arsenic, cadmium, zinc) to levels above regulatory limits. The monitored lead levels in the blood of local school children fell from high that year to insignificant 30 years later.

In 2007, a free testing program was instituted, with removal of above-limit top soil in residential yards (with a priority focus on families with young children). Teck provides funding for this ongoing operation. Because of improvements in smelting processes and emissions controls over the years, the existing contamination is attributed to smelting activities that pre-date the 1997 adoption of newer technologies.

Pakootas v. Teck Cominco Metals

Over the decades it has discharged approximately 10 million to 20 million tons of smelting byproduct containing lead, arsenic and mercury into the Columbia River and Franklin D. Roosevelt Lake in Washington. In 2004, a citizen lawsuit was filed under the 1980 Comprehensive Environmental Response, Compensation, and Liability Act (CERCLA) against Teck Cominco—, now Teck Resources The Supreme Court of the United States (SCOTUS) rejected Teck Metals' Petition for certiorari on June 10, 2019 in Teck Metals Ltd. v. The Confederated Tribes of the Colville Reservation. In 2018, the Supreme Court rejected Teck's appeal and found in favor of the litigants.

Manhattan Project

As its contribution to the Manhattan Project's P-9 Project, Cominco built and operated a 1000 to 1200 pound per month (design capacity) electrolytic heavy water plant at Trail, which operated from 1943 to 1956. Lt-Col Nichols noted environmental damage from emissions to the "beautiful valley and mountain slopes" in the first half of 1943.

Attractions

Trail Memorial Centre & Sports Hall of Memories
The Trail Memorial Centre currently plays host to the Trail & District Public Library, the Trail Smoke Eaters hockey team, the Trail Museum, and the Sports Hall of Memories, in addition to many local sports facilities. This historic landmark, located at 1051 Victoria Street, was home to two world championship Smoke Eaters teams.

The Trail Memorial Centre is a hub of civic activity year-round, and has been a focal point of the community since its inception.

River Activities and Music in the Park at Gyro Park in Trail
Located at 1090 Charles Lakes Drive in East Trail on the route to Sunningdale, Gyro Park is the home to Music in the Park during the summer.

"The Onions" and other popular river currents that wind between the rocks on the East banks of the Columbia River, are a popular summer magnet for river activity.

The Historic Gulch
In the early 1900s a large influx of Italian immigrants lent a distinctive character to "The Gulch" which is located at the entrance to Trail accessed by the Schofield Highway which drops down the long grade from the city of Rossland and the village of Warfield and sub-division of Annabel onto Rossland Avenue.

This neighbourhood which runs the length of Rossland Avenue is known as "the Gulch." Originally called the "Dublin Gulch" in the very early days, it eventually became known as "The Gulch" as it filled up with Italians who chose not to live on the original Trail townsite. The Gulch starts as throat of Trail Creek narrows between the high, sandy slope of Smelter Hill on its left bank and the West Trail bank where early pioneer houses were built by immigrants as they purchased properties along the west bank steep terrain.

In the early pioneer days industrious Chinese launderers and cooks spent time gardening in the defile of the Gulch. Few of these immigrants ever acquired rights to own land in the Gulch and their gardens were gradually displaced by Italians and other European working families who terraced their properties into level plots. Despite the steep terrain, these immigrant families planted vegetable gardens reminiscent of the old country sustained by water from Trail Creek and a hot summer sun.

The Gulch is home to shops and the Terra Nova hotel, located at the entrance to Trail’s central business district at the foot of Rossland Avenue.

Home of Champions
The Greater Trail Area is known as the Home of Champions, in recognition of those who reside in the area, or are from the area, and have excelled in their chosen field of endeavour.

In 1995, Kootenay Savings Credit Union was seeking a project that would represent their commitment and appreciation to the Greater Trail community. The Credit Union decided to sponsor the construction of a monument which was constructed in the summer of 1996 outside their offices in Trail's downtown that would honour the "Champions" of the Greater Trail area in Sports, Industry and Lifestyle.

A society was formed to establish criteria for selection of the persons to be honoured on the monument. The monument was constructed in the summer of 1996 and forty-three champions were selected to be honoured at the inaugural dedication ceremony which took place on September 28, 1996. To date, eighty-nine individuals and organizations have been honoured with a place on the Home of Champions monument.

The Home of Champions monument project is an ongoing one, managed by the City of Trail. Additional persons will be honoured regularly for their special contribution to the social, cultural, economic and educational fabric of the community.

Notable people
John Rogers Anderson, chief of the Defence Staff
Jason Bay, former MLB player
Lauren Bay, Canadian National Softball Team and National Pro Fastpitch pitcher
Ed Cristofoli, former NHL player
Craig Cunningham, former NHL Player
Adam Deadmarsh, former NHL player, won Stanley cup in 1996 with the Colorado Avalanche
Dallas Drake, former NHL player, won Stanley Cup in 2008 with the Detroit Red Wings
Landon Ferraro, current NHL player for the Minnesota Wild
Ray Ferraro, former NHL player and current TSN analyst
Jake Lucchini, current NHL player for the Ottawa Senators
Bruno Freschi, architect for Expo 86
Ken Georgetti, former president of the Canadian Labour Congress
Robert Hampton Gray, one of the last Canadians to die in WWII and the last Canadian recipient of the Victoria Cross
Tom Harrison, former MLB pitcher for the Kansas City A's, now known as the Oakland Athletics
Shawn Hook, singer
Shawn Horcoff former NHL player, most notably a former captain of the Edmonton Oilers
Barret Jackman, former NHL player
Hal Jones, hockey player who won gold at the 1961 Ice Hockey World Championships
Mike Kobluk of the Chad Mitchell Trio
Richard Kromm, former NHL player
Kerrin Lee-Gartner, Canadian Olympic Women's Ski Team, Downhill Olympic Gold Medal 1992

Gary Lunn, former Canadian MP and Cabinet minister

Cesare Maniago, former NHL player

Seth Martin, former NHL player
Mike Matteucci, former NHL player
Steve McCarthy, current AHL player with Springfield Falcons, former NHL player
Tom McVie, former professional hockey player and NHL Coach and current Scout for Boston Bruins
Ben McPeek, composer, arranger, conductor, and pianist
Bill McEwan, President and CEO of Sobeys
Faron Moller, President of the British Colloquium for Theoretical Computer Science
Martin Popoff, heavy metal music journalist
Garth Rizzuto, former NHL player
David Sylvester (medievalist)- President of University of St. Michael's College, University of Toronto, Canada.
Steve Tambellini, former NHL player & former GM of the Edmonton Oilers

See also

 Trail Airport
 Trail Daily Times

Notes

References

External links

Cities in British Columbia
Designated places in British Columbia
Populated places in the West Kootenay
British Columbia populated places on the Columbia River
Italian Canadian settlements